The Okinawa Centenarian Study is a study of the elderly people of Okinawa, Japan. The study, funded by Japan's ministry of health, is the largest of its kind ever carried out. Over the years, the scientists involved have had access to more than 600 Okinawan centenarians.

The elderly of Okinawa enjoy what may be the longest life expectancy in the world, and are also known for enjoying the relatively good health while doing so.
The three leading killers in the West—coronary heart disease, stroke, and cancer—occur in Okinawans with the lowest frequency in the world.

The goal of the study is to find out why this is the case.

Compared to Westerners, the islanders age slowly and are about 80% less likely to get heart disease. They are also a quarter less likely to get breast or prostate cancer. In addition, they have half the risk of getting colon cancer and are less likely than Westerners to get dementia. On average they spend 97% of their lives free of any disabilities.

See also 
 Centenarian
 New England Centenarian Study
 Research into centenarians

References

External links
Okinawa Centenarian Study

Longevity study projects
Health in Japan